Hula (Houla) is a small village in southern Lebanon, on the southern side of the Litani river near the border with Israel. 

The village maintains its cultural traditions to the present day, and holds village festivals. 

During the 1948 Arab-Israeli war two officers from the IDF carried out the Hula massacre in the village, killing over 80 civilians of ages 15–60.

History
The Survey of Western Palestine (1881) mentions several ancient lintels and one olive-press having been found at Hula.

Ottoman period
In 1875 Victor Guérin explores the geographical location of Houla and other Southern villages of Lebanon bordering Palestine, and found that Hula had 300 Shia Muslim inhabitants.

In 1881, the PEF's Survey of Western Palestine (SWP)  described it as: "A village, built of stone, containing about 500 Metawileh, one of the most prominent objects in which is a Sheikh's tomb. It is situated on the hill-top, and is surrounded by olives, vines, and arable land. There are several cisterns, two birkets (one rock-cut), and a spring." It also mentions that a small central mosque is situated on top of one of the hills in the village.

Modern era

On October 24, 1948, the city fell in Israeli's occupation without resistance, children and women were expelled, and men aging from 15 to 60 were gathered in a house.
Between October 30, and November 1, these men were shot dead by lieutenant Shmuel Lahis and his friend, and then they blow the house on their dead bodies. an incident which is known as the Hula massacre. 

Following the 1982 invasion Hula became part of the Israeli Security Zone.

On 6 April 1992 an Israeli Army convoy was ambushed in Hula. Two soldiers were killed and 5 wounded. Islamic Jihad Movement in Palestine, based in Sidon, claimed responsibility. The target had been Major-General Yitzhak Mordechai, head of Israel’s Northern Command. But he had left the convoy earlier. Three of the attackers were killed.

During the 2006 Israel-Lebanon conflict, on July 15, two young women were killed by an Israeli airstrike at the village. On August 7, 2006, an Israeli airstrike on Houla killed another civilian.

References

Bibliography

External links
Survey of Western Palestine, Map 2:  IAA, Wikimedia commons
Houla, Localiban

Populated places in the Israeli security zone 1985–2000
Populated places in Marjeyoun District
Shia Muslim communities in Lebanon